IX Riigikogu was the ninth legislature of the Estonian Parliament (Riigikogu). The legislature was elected after 1999 election.

Election results

Officers
Speaker of the Riigikogu: Toomas Savi.

List of members of the Riigikogu

References

Riigikogu